The Peruvian War of Independence consisted in a series of military conflicts in Peru beginning with viceroy Abascal military victories in the south frontier in 1809, in La Paz revolution and 1811 in the Battle of Guaqui, continuing with the definitive defeat of the Spanish Army in 1824 in the Battle of Ayacucho, and culminating in 1826 with the Siege of Callao. The wars of independence took place with the background of the 1780–1781 uprising by indigenous leader Túpac Amaru II and the earlier removal of Upper Peru and the Río de la Plata regions from the Viceroyalty of Peru. Because of this the viceroy often had the support of the "Lima Oligarchy", who saw their elite interests threatened by popular rebellion and were opposed to the new commercial class in Buenos Aires. During the first decade of the 1800s Peru had been a stronghold for royalists, who fought those in favor of independence in Peru, Bolivia, Quito and Chile. Among the most important events during the war was the proclamation of independence of Peru by José de San Martín on 28 July 1821.

The Independence of Peru was an important chapter in the Spanish American wars of independence. It was a historical and social process, corresponding to the entire period of social phenomena, uprisings and war conflicts. It led to political independence and the emergence of the Peruvian Republic as an independent state from the Spanish monarchy, a result of the political breakdown and disappearance of the Viceroyalty of Peru by the convergence of liberating forces and their children's actions.

The earliest records of a desire for independence can be found beginning with the creation of the Viceroyalty of Peru until well into the 18th century. Throughout these times, there were multiple movements and demonstrations against the colonial domination, some of which turned into actual rebellions. But the application of the Bourbon Reforms increased unease, and disagreement broke out in the Rebellion of Túpac Amaru II. This was not the first nor the last rebellion, but it was the most important and ended in a violent repression by the viceregal authorities, although discontent among the population remained latent. For the first time, colonial documents used the term insurgents as a movement proclaimed the abolition of slavery in Peru. It is debated whether the purpose of this rebellion was a true revolution of the colonial social order or whether emancipation was its objective.

At the beginning of the 19th century, the French invasion of Spain took place. The Spanish kings Carlos IV and his son Fernando VII abdicated the throne to the French emperor Napoleon Bonaparte, who gave the crown to his brother, Joseph Bonaparte. As a consequence of the French occupation, the uprising of Spain took place, and, in different parts of Spanish America, autonomous government boards were created at the same time that disputed the hegemony without pretending to change the colonial order. It was then that the Viceroy Abascal made the Royal Army of Peru, and of the Peruvian Viceroyalty, the base of the counterrevolution before the patriots in Upper Peru, Quito, Chile, and the Río de la Plata. The first autonomous Peruvian rebellions arose in 1811 in the context of indigenous discontent and Creole collaboration with the May Revolution. The Peruvian insurgency put the interior of the country in rebellion, although the multiple uprisings of the Tacna, Huánuco, Huamanga, Cuzco, Apurimac and others did not achieve freedom for the country. However, the guerrilla and montoneras movements were maintained upon the arrival of the liberating forces.

In 1820, the Great Overseas Expedition rebellion made the threat of invasion in the Río de la Plata and Venezuela disappear and made the arrival of the liberating forces in Peru possible. The Liberating Expedition of Peru, under the command of Argentine General José de San Martín, landed on the Peruvian coast from Chile. The royalty abandoned Lima, fortified themselves in Cusco, and General San Martín proclaimed the independence of the Peruvian State on July 28, 1821. Under his Protectorate, the first Constituent Congress of the country was formed. With the stalemate of the conflict and the disappointing Guayaquil Conference with the Liberator Simón Bolívar, San Martín was forced to withdraw from Peru. The young republic was waging a war against the royalist strongholds in the interior of the country with an uncertain outcome. This situation led to the arrival of liberating forces from the north to Peru and of Simón Bolívar, who took over control of the United Liberation Army of Peru.The battles of Junín and Ayacucho took place and culminated in the surrender of the royalist army and the end of the Viceroyalty of Peru.

Consistent with the independence of Peru, in April 1825, the Sucre campaign in Upper Peru ended and, in November of that same year, the Spanish castle of San Juan de Ulúa in Veracruz surrendered to Mexico. Finally, in January 1826, the Spanish strongholds of Callao and Chiloé fell. Spain renounced all its American continental domains in 1836.

The results of Independence were varied: politically, the dependence on Spain was cut off; economically, the dependence on Europe was maintained, and socially, the removal of indigenous lands was accentuated in the republican era. Indigenous domestic workers were treated inhumanely, even in the first decades of the 20th century. They received citizenship at the birth of the republic, on August 27, 1821.

History

During the Peninsular War (1807–1814) central authority in the Spanish Empire was lost and many regions established autonomous juntas. The viceroy of Peru, José Fernando de Abascal y Sousa was instrumental in organizing armies to suppress uprisings in Upper Peru and defending the region from armies sent by the juntas of the Río de la Plata. After success of the royalist armies, Abascal annexed Upper Peru to the viceroyalty, which benefited the Lima merchants as trade from the silver-rich region was now directed to the Pacific. Because of this, Peru remained strongly royalist and participated in the political reforms implemented by the Cortes of Cádiz (1810–1814), despite Abascal's resistance. Peru was represented at the first session of the Cortes by seven deputies and local cabildos (representative bodies) became elected. Therefore, Peru became the second to last redoubt of the Spanish Monarchy in South America, after Upper Peru. Peru eventually succumbed to patriot armies after the decisive continental campaigns of José de San Martín (1820–1823) and Simón Bolívar (1823–1825).

Some of the early Spanish conquistadors who explored Peru made the first attempts for independence from the Spanish crown. They tried to liberate themselves from the Viceroyalty, who governed on behalf of the king of Castile. Throughout the eighteenth century, there were several indigenous uprisings against colonial rule and their treatment by the colonial authorities. Some of these uprisings became true rebellions. The Bourbon Reforms increased the unease, and the dissent had its outbreak in the Rebellion of Túpac Amaru II which was repressed, but the root cause of the discontent of the indigenous people remained dormant. It is debated whether these movements should be considered as precedents of the emancipation that was led by chiefs (caudillos), Peruvian towns (pueblos), and other countries in the American continent.

The independence of Peru was an important chapter in the Hispano-American wars of independence. The campaign of Sucre in Upper Peru concluded in April 1825, and in November of the same year Mexico obtained the surrender of the Spanish bastion of San Juan de Ulúa in North America. The Spanish strongholds in Callao and Chiloé in South America fell in January 1826. Spain renounced all their continental American territories ten years later in 1836 leaving very little of its vast empire intact.

I Part: Junta movements and Insurgency War 1811-1820 

Despite the royalist tendencies of Upper Peru and overall lack of political unrest from the general public between the end of the Rebellion of Túpac Amaru II (which ended in 1783) and 1808, junta movements did emerge. Within this period, divisions between Upper Peru and Southern Peru were evident, especially through the mining industry within the country, with the South overall suffering economically due to discrimination which ultimately provoked bitter protest from mining deputies of Southern Peru in 1804. This was evidently the start of unrest and uprising of the junta movements between the divided country which caused royalist officials to become more aware and cautious of Cuzco and the southern parts of Perú as a whole. Political unrest amped up after the crumbling of the Peruvian government structure, and after being effected by the collapse of monarchy within Spain, the country that colonized Peru, in 1808. Between 1809 and 1814, arguably the timeframe of the major junta movements and protests, Cuzco and the southern provinces of Peru were administratively and politically unstable, as expected from a country whose government is going through a general crisis. This time frame has been characterized by uncertainty and overall confusing after the implementation of the Junta Central and the Council of Regency, efforts made by the then newly monarch-less and overruling Spain.

The first significant attempt of an armed rebellion was in June 1811 in the southern city of Tacna led by Francisco Antonio de Zela. Though this rebellion was more personal, as it had to do with a direct issue Antonio de Zela faced, it demonstrated the desire in the southern region of Peru to reunite with Upper Peru. This movement also proved that those who rebelled in the provinces of southern Peru were much closer with one another, regardless of socioeconomic status, race, or ethnicity than those in Upper Peru (specifically Lima). This was significant due to the divisions between citizens due to features such as race and background and that though there may have been tensions between the groups, their common belief that Peru should be independent from Spanish-ruling overpowered all other differences they may have had.

Another significant movement, led by Natives in Huánuco, began on 22 February 1812. This movement was partially initiated by the motives of Juan Jose Castelli within the First Upper Peru Campaign. It was also begun as a protest against the corruption within local governments which illegally implemented a policy that disadvantaged indigenous merchants in the area. The rebellion lasted three months, ending in May 1812, was, like the Tacna movement, united more citizens in southern Peru of different backgrounds and proved the anti-peninsular beliefs of rebels a part of the junta movements. It involved various leaders, including curacas and township magistrates (alcaldes pedáneos), but was suppressed within a few weeks.

More enduring was the rebellion of Cuzco from 1814 to 1815.

The rebellion began in a confrontation between the Constitutional Cabildo and the Audiencia of Cuzco, made up of officeholders and Europeans, over the administration of the city and spread much more rapidly than any prior movement. Cabildo officials and their allies were arrested by the Audiencia. Seemingly a culmination of the prior rebellions, the motives of the 1814 movement declared by the main leaders included the struggle for power (specifically independent power from Spain), the disapproval of Fernando VII and the lack of application of promised reforms by the Audiencia. Criollo leaders appealed to retired brigadier Mateo Pumacahua, then in his 70s, who was curaca of Chinchero, and decades earlier had been instrumental in suppressing the Rebellion of Túpac Amaru II. This was monumental as Pumacahua changed his beliefs for the national cause, something he was against when rebelling against Túpac Amaru II's similar stance in the Rebellion of Túpac Amaru II earlier. The rebellion continued to move their efforts towards Lima and Upper Peru to inspire and spread attention to the public  and officials opposed to their beliefs. This movement also made note of the uselessness of the position of viceroyalty as a whole, though specifically in Upper Peru where it was the center of Royalist reaction Pumacahua joined the Criollo leaders in forming a junta on 3 August in Cuzco, which demanded the complete implementation of the liberal reforms of the Spanish Constitution of 1812. After some victories in southern Peru and Upper Peru, the rebellion was squashed by mid-1815 when a combined strength of royal forces and loyal curacas, among which were the Catacora and Apo Cari took Cuzco and executed Pumacahua.

II Part: Americas Liberating Currents of Bolivar and San Martín

José de San Martín the Liberation Army of the South and the Founding of the Peruvian Republic 

After the squashing of the aforementioned rebellion, the Viceroy of Peru organised two expeditions; conformed by the royalist regiments of Lima and Arequipa, and expeditionary elements from Europe; against the Chilean Patriots. In 1814, the first expedition was successful in reconquering Chile after winning the Battle of Rancagua. In 1817 following the royalist defeat in the Battle of Chacabuco, the second expedition against the Chilean Patriots in 1818 was an attempt to restore the monarchy. Initially it was successful in the Second Battle of Cancha Rayada, the expedition was finally defeated by José de San Martín in the Battle of Maipú.

To begin the liberation of Peru, Argentina and Chile signed a treaty on 5 February 1819 to prepare for the invasion. General José de San Martín believed that the liberation of Argentina wouldn't be secure until the royalist stronghold in Peru was defeated.

Peruvian campaign 
Two years after the Battle of Maipú, and the subsequent liberation of Chile, the patriots began the preparations for an amphibious assault force to liberate Peru. Originally the costs were to be assumed by both Chile and Argentina, however the Chilean government under Bernardo O'Higgins ended up assuming most of costs of the campaign. Nonetheless, it was determined that the land army was to be commanded by José de San Martín, whilst the navy was to be commanded by admiral Thomas Alexander Cochrane.

On 21 August 1820, the Peruvian Liberation Expedition set sail from the city of Valparaiso under the Chilean flag. The expedition was composed of 4,118 soldiers. On 7 September the Liberation expedition arrived on the bay of Pisco in today's Region of Ica and captured the province by the following day. In an attempt to negotiate, the viceroy of Peru sent a letter to José de San Martín 15 September. However, negotiations broke down on 14 October with no clear result.

Beginning of hostilities 
On 9 October 1820 the uprising of the reserve regiment of Grenadiers of Cusco began, which culminated in the proclamation of the Independence of Guayaquil. Then on 21 October, General José shot himself.

Actual hostilities began with the Sierra Campaign, led by patriot General Juan Antonio Álvarez de Arenales beginning on 5 October 1820. During this campaign, General Arenales proclaimed the independence of the city of Huamanga (Ayacucho) on 1 November 1820. This was followed by the Battle of Cerro de Pasco, where General Arenales defeated a royalist division sent by viceroy Pezuela. The rest of the liberation forces under Admiral Cochrane captured the royalist frigate Esmeralda on 9 November 1820, dealing the royalist navy a heavy blow. On 2 December 1820 the royalist battalion Batallón Voltígeros de la Guardia defected to the patriots' side.  On 8 January 1821, the armed column of General Álvarez de Arenales regroups with the rest of the expedition in the coast.

Viceroy Pezuela was ousted and replaced by General José de la Serna on 29 January 1821. In March 1821, incursions led by Miller and Cochrane attacked the royalist ports of Arica and Tacna.  The new viceroy announced his departure from Lima on 5 June 1821, but ordered a garrison to resist the patriots in the Real Felipe Fortress, leading to the First Siege of Callao. The royalist army under the command of General José de Canterac leaves Lima, and proceeded to the highlands on 25 June 1821. General Arenales was sent by General San Martín to observe the royalist retreat. Two days after, the Liberation Expedition entered Lima. Under fear of repression and pillaging, the inhabitants of Lima begged General San Martín to enter Lima.

Declaration of Independence of Peru 
Once inside Lima, General San Martín invited all of the populace of Lima to swear oath to the Independence cause. The signing of the Act of Independence of Peru was held on 15 July 1821. Manuel Pérez de Tudela, later Minister of International Relations wrote the Act of Independence. Admiral Cochrane is welcomed in Lima two days later; General José de San Martín announces in the Plaza Mayor of Lima the famous declaration of independence:

San Martín Abandons Peru 

José de la Serna, moves his headquarters to Cuzco. He sends troops under the command of General Canterac which arrive in Lima 10 September 1821. He is successful in reuniting with the besieged forces of General José de La Mar, in the Fortress of Real Felipe. After learning the viceroy new orders, he leaves to the highlands again on 16 September of the same year. The republicans pursued the retreating royalists until reaching Jauja on 1 October 1821.

After a row with General San Martin, Admiral Cochrane leaves Peru on 10 May 1822, being replaced by Martin Guisse as head of the navy. 
The war was stalled after a resounding victory of the Royal Army in the battle of Ica or Macacona farm. In April 1822, a royalist incursion defeats a Republican Army in the Battle of Ica. Afterwards, in October 1822 the republicans under General Rudecindo Alvarado experience another costly defeat at the hands of the royalist.

On the north, Antonio José de Sucre, in Guayaquil requests help from San Martín. He complies and leads the Auxiliary Expedition of Santa Cruz to Quito. Afterwards, during the Entrevista de Guayaquil, San Martín and Bolívar attempted to decide the political fate of Peru. San Martín opted for a Constitutional Monarchy, whilst Simon Bolivar (Head of the Northern Expedition) opted for a Republican. Nonetheless, they both followed the notion that it was to be independent of Spain. Following the interview, General San Martin abandons Peru 22 September 1822 and leaves whole command of the Independence movement to Simon Bolivar.

Simón Bolívar, the Northern Expedition, and the consolidation of independence 

Following the declaration of Independence, the Peruvian state was bogged down by the royalist resistance, and instability of the republic itself. Hence, whilst the coast and Northern Peru was under the command of the republic, the rest of the country was under the control of the royalists. Viceroy La Serna had established his capital in the city of Cuzco. Another campaign under General Santa Cruz against the royalist is defeated. The end of the war would only come with the military intervention of Gran Colombia. Following the self exile of San Martin, and the constant military defeats under president José de la Riva Agüero, the congress decided to send a plea in 1823 for the help of Simón Bolívar. Bolivar arrived in Lima 10 December 1823 with the aims of liberating all of Peru.

In 1824, an uprising in the royalist camp in Alto Peru (Modern Bolivia), would pave the way for the battles of Junin and Ayacucho. The Peruvian Army triumphed in the battle of Junin under the personal orders of Simon Bolivar, and in the battle of Ayacucho under command of General Antonio José de Sucre. The war would not end until the last royalist holdouts surrendered the Real Felipe Fortress in 1826.

Aftermath
Political dependence on Spain had been severed, but Peru was still economically dependent on Europe. Despite the separation from Spain, the plunder of lands from indigenous people was exacerbated in this new republican era. Indigenous domestic servants were treated inhumanely well into the 20th century. During the birth of the republic, the indigenous people obtained open citizenship in Peru, 27 August 1861.

After the war of independence, conflicts of interests that faced different sectors of the Criollo society and the particular ambitions of individual caudillos, made the organization of the country excessively difficult. Only three civilians: Manuel Pardo, Nicolás de Piérola and Francisco García Calderón would accede to the presidency in the first seventy-five years of independent life.  In 1837, the Peru-Bolivian Confederation was created but it was dissolved two years later due to a combined military intervention of Peruvian patriots.

See also
Royalist (Hispanic American Revolution)
Bolivian War of Independence
 Higgins, James (editor). The Emancipation of Peru: British Eyewitness Accounts, 2014. Online at https://sites.google.com/site/jhemanperu

References

External links
  Peruvian Act of Independence
  Ayacucho República Aristocrática photo gallery

 
1810s conflicts
1810s in Peru
1820s conflicts
1820s in Peru
Spanish American wars of independence
Independence
Wars involving Spain
Colonial Peru
Peru–Spain relations